Kudela, Kúdela or Kuděla (Czech feminine: Kúdelová or Kudělová) is a surname. Notable people with the surname include:

 Ondřej Kúdela (born 1987), Czech footballer
 Radek Kuděla (born 1985), Czech footballer
 Jola Kudela (born 1970), Polish artist and filmmaker

Czech-language surnames